According to Hoyle is a lost 1922 American silent adventure film directed by W.S. Van Dyke and starring David Butler, Helen Ferguson, and Philip Ford.

Plot
As described in a film magazine, 'Boxcar' Simmons (D. Butler) is tramping the railroad ties to nowhere when from a car window blows a set of rules telling how to be a success for life. The idea rather appeals to Simmons so he sets out to live by them, changing his hobo garb for better clothes for, as the rules state, "God helps those who help themselves." Simmons is mistaken for a millionaire mining man. Dude Miller (F. Butler) and Jim Riggs (Todd) set out to sell him a rock-studded farm. Simmons discovers that Doris Mead (Ferguson) and her brother Jim (Ford) were previously swindled by the two slickers. He "salts" the ranch and the slickers pay out a large sum to buy his option, thinking it to be a rich silver ore deposit. Simmons turns this money over to Doris and her brother. The slickers, finding that they have been tricked, crack the hotel safe and steal Simmons' wallet and its rules for success. Once safely away they open the wallet and find and read the last rule: "Once you get a good start -- keep going!"

Cast
 David Butler as 'Boxcar' Simmons 
 Helen Ferguson as Doris Mead 
 Philip Ford as Jim Mead 
 Fred J. Butler as Dude Miller 
 Harry Todd as Jim Riggs 
 Bud Ross as Silent Johnson 
 Hal Wilson as Bellboy 
 Francis X. Bushman

References

Bibliography
 Munden, Kenneth White. The American Film Institute Catalog of Motion Pictures Produced in the United States, Part 1. University of California Press, 1997.

External links

1922 films
1922 adventure films
American adventure films
Films directed by W. S. Van Dyke
American silent feature films
1920s English-language films
American black-and-white films
Lost American films
1922 lost films
1920s American films
Silent adventure films